Mudhaykhirah District is a district of the Ibb Governorate, Yemen. In 2003, the district had a population of 77,835.

References

Districts of Ibb Governorate
Mudhaykhirah District